Susan Kelley may refer to:

 Susan Kelley (figure skater) (born 1954)
 Susan J. Kelley, Dean of the College of Health and Human Sciences at Georgia State University

See also
 Susan Kelly, American model and actress
Sue W. Kelly, congresswoman